Lokesh Kanagaraj (born 14 March 1986) is an Indian film director and screenwriter who works in Tamil films. He started his career with a short film in the 2016 anthology Aviyal. He later directed his first feature film Maanagaram (2017). He created the Lokesh Cinematic Universe franchise with his films Kaithi (2019) and Vikram (2022). His upcoming film, Leo, marks his second collaboration with Vijay after Master (2021).

Early life 
Lokesh Kanagaraj was born in Kinathukadavu, Coimbatore district of Tamil Nadu, India. In PSG College of Arts and Science, he majored in Fashion Technology before pursuing an MBA. He did his schooling in Palanayiammal Matric Hr. Sec. School Kalliyapuram, Pollachi. He is an ex-bank employee. He pursued his passion towards film making by participating in a corporate short film competition. The judge of the competition was Karthik Subbaraj. Impressed with his short film, he encouraged Lokesh to pursue a directorial career making films.

Career 
In 2016, his short film, Kalam, was included in the anthology film, Aviyal, produced by Karthick Subbaraj. In 2017, he made his directorial feature debut with the hyperlink film, Maanagaram. In late 2018, he began working on a film for Dream Warrior Pictures, the same production company behind Maanagaram. With Karthi in the lead role, the action-thriller was titled Kaithi.

His next after Kaithi was the action-drama film, Master, starring Vijay and Vijay Sethupathi.
It was released on 13 January 2021, a day before the Pongal festival. It opened to mostly positive reviews and emerged as a commercial success. Master was the highest grossing Tamil film of 2021.Highest-grossing Indian films of 2021

He then directed Vikram (2022), starring Kamal Haasan, Vijay Sethupathi, and Fahadh Faasil. Following the huge success of the film, he is actively creating the Lokesh Cinematic Universe, on the basis of carrying the story forward from Kaithi and Vikram. His next directorial after Vikram will be Vijay's 67th film, Leo.

Filmography

Accolades

References

External links 
 

Living people
Tamil film directors
Tamil screenwriters
21st-century Indian film directors
1986 births